Epicnapteroides is a genus of moths in the family Lasiocampidae. The genus was erected by Strand in 1912.

Species
Epicnapteroides fuliginosa Pinhey, 1973
Epicnapteroides lobata Strand, 1912
Epicnapteroides marmorata Pinhey, 1973

References

Lasiocampidae